Secondary Highway 537, commonly referred to as Highway537, is a provincially maintained secondary highway in the Canadian province of Ontario. It once continued  further to intersect Highway 17 in Wahnapitae, but was truncated in 1998; this portion of the route is now designated as Greater Sudbury Municipal Road 537. Highway537 remains the only secondary highway in the province within a jurisdiction that also maintains a county/regional road network.

Route description 
Highwa537 is a  cut-off route between Highway69 and Highway17 southeast of Sudbury.
It is also the main access road to the communities of Wanup and St. Cloud. The two-laned highway is paved for its entire length, as well as for the  that continues as Municipal Road537.

Prior to 2009, the highway began at Highway69, which at that time followed Estaire Road, immediately north of the Wanapitei River. It then proceeded north for  alongside the river to the intersection with the current route in Wanup.

From Wanup, the highway travels eastward and northward towards Highway17, travelling through sparsely populated forest along the way. It crosses the Wanapitei River at the community of St. Cloud. Provincial maintenance of the route ends just north of a small development at Finni Road, where the road continues as Sudbury Municipal Road537 north into Wahnapitae, ending at Highway17 within the community.

According to the Ministry of Transportation (MTO), on an average day, approximately 3,150vehicles travel Highway537 between the Wanapitei River and Finni Road, while approximately 570vehicles travel the highway between Estaire Road and the Wanapitei River. These represent the heaviest and least travelled sections of the route.

History 
Highway537 was first assumed by the Department of Highways (DHO), predecessor to the modern MTO, in 1956, along with several dozen other secondary highways. It may have been provincially maintained as a development road prior to that.
The Wanup–Wanapitei Road was assumed by the DHO on May9, 1956, connecting Highway69 with Highway17.
It was an unpaved gravel road at the time,
and remained as such until the mid-1980s; it was paved in 1984 or 1985.

As part of a series of budget cuts initiated by premier Mike Harris under his Common Sense Revolution platform in 1995, numerous highways deemed to no longer be of significance to the provincial network were decommissioned and responsibility for the routes transferred to a lower level of government, a process referred to as downloading. The  section of Highway537 within Nickel Centre was transferred to the Regional Municipality of Sudbury on January1, 1998.
The remainder of the highway was in the unincorporated townships of Dill, Cleland, and Dryden, and had no lower government to take over maintenance of the Highway 537 route until the area was amalgamated with the region to form Greater Sudbury on January1, 2001.
Following the amalgamation a further  of the route, between the former Cleland–Dryden Township boundary and the former Dryden–Nickel Centre boundary, was transferred to Greater Sudbury, but the remainder of the route still retains its provincial highway designation.

As part of the plan to extend Highway 400 north to Sudbury along the Highway69 corridor, a new four lane freeway was constructed between Estaire and south of Sudbury. Work began in 2005, and resulted in the construction of a new alignment of Highway537 west from Wanup to what was then Highway69 (Estaire Road), with an interchange at the new freeway. Both were completed and opened to traffic on November12, 2009.
Highway 537 was rerouted along the new alignment, while the former routing south from Wanup was renamed Old Wanup Road. It remains part of the provincial highway system under the unsigned 7000-series designation of Highway7042.

The Jumbo Creek crossing along Highway 537 experienced annual flooding that resulted in closure of the road and lengthy detours. At the behest of Sudbury councillor Deb McIntosh, Minister of Transportation Steven Del Duca committed to the rehabilitation project on June 15, 2015. The project to raise the roadway through the creek floodplain was tendered in 2018, and proceeded over the course of the summer of 2019 and 2020.
It was completed on October 5, 2020.

Major intersections

References

External links 
 Highway 537 - Length and Route
 Highway 537 at OntHighways.com

537
Roads in Greater Sudbury